The WCCC or Western Collegiate Cycling Conference is a collegiate cycling conference based in the western United States. The conference is composed of 29 schools from California, Northern Nevada, and Hawaii. Schools include current Road National Champions UC Davis as well as former champions Stanford and UC Berkeley. The schools in the conference compete in road cycling races in the spring and mountain bike racing in the fall. The conference is governed by the National Collegiate Cycling Association, a division of USA Cycling. The conference is split into two divisions.

Division I 
California Polytechnic State University
California State University, Fresno
California State University, Fullerton
California State University, Long Beach
California State University, Sacramento
San Diego State University
San Francisco State University
San Jose State University
Stanford University
University of California, Berkeley
University of California, Davis
University of California, Irvine
University of California, Los Angeles
University of California, San Diego
University of California, Santa Barbara
University of California, Santa Cruz
University of Nevada, Reno
University of Southern California

Division II 
California Lutheran University
California Maritime Academy
Claremont Colleges
California State University, Channel Islands
California State University, Chico
California State University, San Marcos
Humboldt State University
Santa Barbara City College
Santa Clara University
University of California, Hastings College of the Law
University of Hawaii, Manoa

External links
WCCC Homepage

Cycle racing in the United States
College sports conferences in the United States
Cycling organizations in the United States
Cycling events
Sports in the Western United States